Secugnago is a comune (municipality) in the Province of Lodi in the Italian region Lombardy, located about  southeast of Milan and about  southeast of Lodi.

Secugnago borders the following municipalities: Turano Lodigiano, Mairago, Brembio, Casalpusterlengo.

Demographic evolution

References

External links
 www.comune.secugnago.lo.it/

Cities and towns in Lombardy